Turkey took part in the Eurovision Song Contest in 1981. The country was represented by Ayşegül Aldinç and a trio named Modern Folk Üçlüsü with the song "Dönme Dolap" written and composed by Ali Kocatepe.

Before Eurovision

5. Eurovision Şarkı Yarışması Türkiye Finali 
The final took place on 14 February 1981 at the TRT Studios in Ankara, hosted by Bülend Özveren. Six songs competed and the winner was determined by a jury consisting of members of the public.

At Eurovision
On the night of the contest Ayşegül Aldinç and Modern Folk Üçlüsü performed second in the running order following Austria and preceding Germany. At the close of the voting the song received 9 points, thus Dönme Dolap shared 18th place with Portugal. Turkish jury awarded 12 points to Germany.

Members of the Turkish jury included Süheyla Aldoğan, Hidayet Yarken, Hatice Akbaş, Lüftiye Duman, Nebiye Yazıcı, Nesrin Demirel, Sami Ersoy, Mehmet Kuteş, Mustafa Ekinci, Cengiz Doğan, and Ali Arslan.

Voting

References 

1981
Countries in the Eurovision Song Contest 1981
Eurovision